B. Burinbeki (February 26, 1928 - October 11, 2009) was a modern Mongol poet. He was born to a poor family in Baarin Right Banner, Joo Oda League, Inner Mongolia, only received several years of basic education. His mother was a folk singer. In 1948 he attend the Communist movement, and entered the Jinchareliao Union University to study literature and art in the same year. Burinbeki mainly writes in Mongolian. His poetry collections published include Hello Spring, Gold season, Fireworks of life, Phoenix, Fountain and Poems of Ba Burinbeki. He also wrote several poetry criticism books such as Notes of a poet seeking heartfelt wishes, Mongolian Poetry Aesthetics, Poetics of Mongolian epic and so on.

References 

1928 births
2009 deaths
People from Chifeng
20th-century Mongolian poets
Inner Mongolia University alumni
Academic staff of Inner Mongolia University
Chinese people of Mongolian descent
20th-century Chinese poets